Port Elizabeth is a resettled community in Newfoundland and Labrador.

Ghost towns in Newfoundland and Labrador